Saint George church Greek Catholic Parish Church (UGCC) in Shmankivchyky of the Zavodske settlement hromada of the Chortkiv Raion of the Ternopil Oblast.

History 
The Greek Catholic community has long belonged to the parish. Registration of the religious community of the UGCC in the village of Shmankivchyky took place on July 24, 1991.

In the spring of 1992, the construction of the chapel began and in May, on Mother's Day, it was consecrated by Fr. Bohdan Nedilsky.

March 18, 2012 at the initiative of Fr. Ivan Senkiv consecrated the cornerstone and began construction of a new church.

In 2014, on Palm Sunday, Fr. Roman Litvinov consecrated the cross in the church.

In 2018, the construction of the temple was completed. The temple was consecrated on the temple holiday on May 6. The consecration ceremony was performed by the Bishop of the Buchach Eparchy Dmytro Hryhorak, OSBM.

The Apostolate of Prayer fraternity operates in the parish.

The village also has a chapel of St. George (1992).

Abbots 
 at. Bogdan Nedilsky (1992-2000)
 at. Bohdan Shkilnytsky (2000-2005)
 at. Zeno the Beekeeper
 at. Serhiy Lishchynsky (2005-2006)
 at. Ivan Senkiv (2006-2013)
 at. Roman Litvinov has been the parish administrator since September 2013

References

Sources 
 Парафія с. Шманьківчики. Церква святого Юрія // Бучацька єпархія УГКЦ. Парафії, монастирі, храми. Шематизм / Автор концепції Куневич Б.; керівник проекту, науковий редактор Стоцький Я. — Тернопіль : ТОВ «Новий колір», 2014. — С. 305. : іл. — ISBN 978-966-2061-30-7.

Churches in Ukraine